The 113th Fighter Escadrille of the Polish Air Force (Polish: 113. Eskadra Myśliwska) was one of the fighter units of the Polish Army at the beginning of  World War II.

Crew and equipment 

On 1 September 1939 the escadrille had 10 planes: five PZL P.11c and five PZL P.11a. The commanding officer was pil. Wieńczysław Barański and his deputy was ppor. pil. Włodzimierz Klawe.

Pilots

 ppor. Hieronim Dudwał
 ppor. Włodzimierz Klawe
 ppor. Stanisław Zatorski
 pchor. Rajmund Kalpas
 pchor. Jerzy Radomski
 pchor. Henryk Stefankiewicz
 pchor. Janusz Szaykowski
 plut. Mieczysław Każmierczak
 plut. Kazimierz Sztramko
 kpr. Michał Cwynar
 st. szer. Mieczysław Adamek
 st. szer. Zdzisław Horn
 st. szer. Krzysztof Krzyżagórski
 st. szer. Witold Lipiński

See also
Polish Air Force order of battle in 1939

References
 

Polish Air Force escadrilles